The G7 Rapid Response Mechanism (RRM) is an initiative introduced in the "Charlevoix Commitment on Defending Democracy from Foreign Threats", issued by the leaders of the Group of Seven G7 countries—United States, Canada, Japan, United Kingdom, France, Germany and Italy—on June 9, 2018, during their summit in Charlevoix, Quebec. The RRM's mandate is to strengthen the coordination of G7 member countries

The G7 is an informal international intergovernmental economic organization that meets annually, whose members represent the seven wealthiest advanced economies in the world, as measured by the International Monetary Fund (IMF).

Mandate
The RRM was mandated to "strengthen coordination to prevent, thwart and respond to malign and evolving threats to G7 democracies." It "will share information and threat analysis related to various threats to democracy, and is an established mechanism to identify opportunities for coordinated response."

According to the Institute for Research on Public Policy's Policy Options magazine, the "RRM initiative seeks to strengthen the leading democracies' coordination to identify and respond to diverse and evolving threats…including through sharing information and analysis, and identifying opportunities for a coordinated response."

Administration
The RRM initiative is led by Canada through Global Affairs Canada's Centre for International Digital Policy. Tara Denham, Director of the Centre for International Digital Policy at Global Affairs Canada, directed the team responsible for setting up the RRM Coordination Unit.

Global Affairs Canada—the Department of Foreign Affairs, Trade and Development—is the federal Canadian ministry responsible for diplomatic and consular relations, international trade, and international development and humanitarian assistance. The Centre for International Digital Policy includes the Digital Inclusion Lab and the RRM. Denham is also the RRM's Canadian Focal Point.

At a briefing on "the security and intelligence threats to elections" of the House of Commons Standing Committee on Access to Information, Privacy and Ethics, the chair  Bob Zimmer (CPC), said that the 2019 general election "may be different" from past elections in Canada. as the "tools that were used to strengthen civic engagement are being used to undermine, disrupt and destabilize democracy." 
 
Zimmer described the initiative's three pillars.

 "enhancing citizen preparedness" through the "digital citizen initiative"
 "improving organizational readiness" with national security and intelligence agencies supporting Elections Canada
 "ensure a comprehensive understanding of and response to any threats to Canada's democratic process." by establishing the Security and Intelligence Threats to Elections Task Force (SITE) which works as a team with the Communications Security Establishment (CSE), the Canadian Security Intelligence Service (CSIS), the Royal Canadian Mounted Police (RCMP), as well as Global Affairs Canada

Zimmer said that as part of the third pillar, "We have activated the G7 rapid response mechanism, announced at the G7 leaders' summit in Charlevoix, to strengthen coordination among our G7 allies and to ensure that there is international collaboration and coordination in responding to foreign threats to democracy."

Background

Charlevoix summit
The G7 met from June 8 to 9, 2019 during their summit at the Manoir Richelieu in Charlevoix, in La Malbaie, Quebec. The Charlevoix Summit was the 44th G7 summit.

The group issued eight "Commitments" at the summit. They included:

 Commitment on Defending Democracy from Foreign Threats
 Commitment on Equality and Economic Growth
 Commitment to End Sexual and Gender-Based Violence, Abuse and Harassment in Digital Contexts
 Declaration on Quality Education for Girls, Adolescent Girls and Women in Developing Countries
 Commitment on Innovative Financing for Development.

Prime Minister Justin Trudeau announced five themes for Canada's G7 presidency which began in January 2018.

Defending Democracy from Foreign Threats 

They committed to "cooperate in defending democracies from foreign threats and establish a response mechanism for that purpose". 
The Charlevoix Commitment states that "foreign actors seek to undermine our democratic societies and institutions, our electoral processes, our sovereignty and our security. These malicious, multi-faceted and ever-evolving tactics constitute a serious strategic threat which we commit to confront together, working together with other governments that share our democratic values." The Charlevoix Summit resolved to "establish a G7 Rapid Response Mechanism to strengthen our coordination to identify and respond to diverse and evolving threats to our democracies, including through sharing information and analysis, and identifying opportunities for coordinated response."

Monitored elections

2019 European Parliament election 
RRM Canada's comprehensive report on the 2019 European Parliament election analyzed open data "related to foreign interference during and leading up to the 2019 European Union Parliamentary Elections, May 23–26, 2019". RRM Canada did not find "significant evidence of state-based foreign interference, or any large-scale, organized and coordinated efforts by non-state actors". They did find that "national or international non-state actors" used tactics based on those used by the Russian sponsored Internet Research Agency (IRA) in previous elections, "such as the 2016 U.S. Elections". For example, blogs, webpages, and social media accounts on Twitter, Facebook and Reddit "were used to spread divisive and false information to damage and negatively impact social cohesion and trust in democratic processes and institutions" in coordinated networks of Facebook groups.

2019 Alberta general election 

RRM Canada's analyz report on the 2019 Alberta general election was intended to "identify any emerging tactics in foreign interference and draw lessons learned for the Canadian general elections scheduled to take place in October 2019." No foreign activity was detected, although the data revealed ""suspicious account creation pattern that is indicative of troll or bot activity".

They found "automated inauthentic behaviour and trolling activities" but concluded that they were "very likely domestic". The data showed "suspicious account creation pattern that is indicative of troll or bot activity", and "spikes in account creation" which suggested the "presence of accounts developed for a specific purpose." The accounts were very likely domestic and were "mainly  supporters of the United Conservative Party (UCP)." A second small community with suspicious account creation patterns were identified as supporters of the national People's Party of Canada. The report concluded that there was "no evidence supporting a broad, coordinated campaign to influence the Alberta election."

The report noted that "domestic actors" were "emulating" "tactics used by foreign actors, within the context of provincial elections and that this "behaviour will make it increasingly difficult to distinguish national from foreign interference efforts" in the upcoming 2019 Canadian federal election on October 21, 2019.

In January 2019, Policy Options said that, "the nascent Rapid Response Mechanism (RRM) initiated in 2018 under Canada's G7 presidency to defend against foreign threats holds promise and could offer a valuable model of cooperation for future efforts to defend democracy and the ideas that underlie it." The RRM initiative seeks to strengthen the leading democracies' “coordination to identify and respond to diverse and evolving threats…including through sharing information and analysis, and identifying opportunities for a coordinated response."

Disruption tactics

Divisive narratives 
RRM Canada identified a shift from information warfare to narrative competition, in which narratives about divisive issues such as "immigration, Muslims in Europe, climate change and liberal vs conservative values" are disseminated and amplified across "national borders and global political contexts to engage pan-European, regional and international communities." National or international non-state actors would strategically amplify inauthentic, divisive and inflammatory content on topics such as "immigration/migration, anti-religious sentiment (Muslim and Jewish), nationalist identity, women’s health, gender-based harassment and climate change".

Decontextualizing authentic information 
In the European Union, RRM data analysis showed that authentic information was "de-contextualized", "manipulated" and "distorted", then used by "questionable" writers on "untrustworthy" sites to "seed conversations", which were then "framed using a divisive and inflammatory narrative." These would reference the original authentic source. In a "coordinated fashion" the information would be "amplified" with the most "susceptible communities" targeted. It would be translated into a number of different languages. The RRM Canada report said that a "version of this tactic has been observed as being used by Kremlin-linked actors and is a known tactic of covert, malicious foreign actors."

References

G7 summits
2018 in international relations
Organizations established in 2018
Election and voting-related organizations
Social media

International organizations based in Canada